Johann Sebastian Bach (26 September 1748 – 11 September 1778) was a German painter. He was the son of composer Carl Philipp Emanuel Bach and the grandson of composer Johann Sebastian Bach.

Bach was born in Berlin. He studied under Adam Friedrich Oeser in Leipzig. In May 1773, he moved to Dresden, and in February 1776 he moved to Hamburg, where his father was Director of Music. In September 1776 he embarked on a study trip to Rome, where he became seriously ill soon after his arrival in February 1777, and died, aged 29, of this unknown ailment in 1778.

Bach created mostly brush drawings of idyllic landscapes, bustling with people. His works show the influence of Salomon Gessner. Towards the end of his life, he turned to representations of people and created historical and mythological scenes. He also made vignettes and illustrations of works by Gottlieb Rabener and Christian Felix Weiße.

Collections of his works are in Coburg, Dresden, Hamburg, Leipzig and Vienna.

References

Anke Fröhlich: Zwischen Empfindsamkeit und Klassizismus, Der Zeichner und Landschaftsmaler Johann Sebastian Bach der Jüngere (1748–1778), Leipzig : Evangelische Verlagsanstalt, 2007,

External links

18th-century German painters
18th-century German male artists
German male painters
Johann Sebastian II
1748 births
1778 deaths